The Battle of Volochayevka was an important battle of the Far Eastern Front in the latter part of the Russian Civil War. It occurred on February 10 through 12, 1922, near Volochayevka station on the Amur Railway, on the outskirts of the city of Khabarovsk.

The People's Revolutionary Army of the Far Eastern Republic under Vasily Blyukher defeated units of the counterrevolutionary Far Eastern White Army led by Viktorin Molchanov.

Background – November 1921 White offensive
In November 1921 the Far Eastern White Army launched an offensive against the Far Eastern Republic, supported by Japan, which wanted a foothold in the Russian Far East. The White army, based on Vladivostok, advanced into the north of Primorskaya Oblast, following the railroad and the Ussuri River, occupying cities, towns and villages, and capturing Khabarovsk.

Throughout January 1922 the two armies skirmished and fought in this area.

Battle
At dawn on February 10, 1922, in severe cold and deep snow, Blyukher's Red Army attacked the White positions. The Reds had 7,600 soldiers with hundreds of machine guns and 30 field guns, and two light machine-gun tanks. The White Army had 4,950 soldiers equipped with 13 guns and many fewer automatic weapons.

The Red attack of February 10 was repulsed with heavy losses. One of the Red tanks was knocked out and the other broke down. Wounded died quickly in the  temperatures. Blyukher regrouped on February 11, then attacked again on February 12. This time, the 3rd and 6th Regiments broke through the wire and after fierce fighting the Reds captured Ju-Quran hill around noon. This rendered the White position untenable, and Molchanov retreated.

Aftermath
On February 13, Molchanov's White forces retreated past Khabarovsk and the Red Army entered the city.

The Red Army was too exhausted to effectively pursue the White Army, which escaped encirclement. However, White military fortunes continued on a downward path after this battle, and the last remnants of White and Japanese forces in the Far East surrendered or evacuated by October 25, 1922.

References

Volochaevka
1922 in Russia
February 1922 events